This is a complete list of Vichy France flying aces who flew during the Second World War.

See also
 List of World War II aces from France

Footnotes

References

.
.Vichy